Idiopteryx is a genus of moth in the family Lecithoceridae.

Species
Idiopteryx adelella (Viette, 1955) (from Madagascar)
Idiopteryx descarpentriesella Viette, 1954 (from Madagascar)
Idiopteryx marionella Viette, 1954 (from Madagascar)
Idiopteryx obitsyella Viette, 1986 (from Madagascar)
Idiopteryx obliquella (Walsingham, 1881) (from South Africa)
Idiopteryx tananaella Viette, 1985 (from Madagascar)

References

De Prins, J. & De Prins, W. 2015. Afromoths, online database of Afrotropical moth species (Lepidoptera). World Wide Web electronic publication (www.afromoths.net) (acc.: 13-Dec.-2015)
Markku Savela's ftp.funet.fi

 
Lecithoceridae
Moth genera